Dolichoderus granulinotus is an extinct species of Eocene ant in the genus Dolichoderus. Described by Dlussky in 2008, the species fossils were discovered in the Baltic amber.

References

†
Eocene insects
Prehistoric insects of Europe
Fossil taxa described in 2008
Fossil ant taxa